Albion is a town in Albion and Jefferson townships, Noble County, in the U.S. state of Indiana. The population was 2,349 at the 2010 census. The city is the county seat of Noble County.

History
Albion was laid out in 1846. The town was named after Albion, New York. A post office has been in operation at Albion since 1847.

The Albion Courthouse Square Historic District, Noble County Courthouse, and Noble County Sheriff's House and Jail are listed on the National Register of Historic Places.

Geography
Albion is located at  (41.395132, -85.422026).

Demographics

2010 census 
As of the 2010 census, there were 2,349 people, 831 households, and 530 families living in the town. The racial makeup of the town was 97.4% White, 0.4% African American, 0.2% Native American, 0.4% Asian, 0.6% from other races, and 1.1% from two or more races. Hispanic or Latino of any race were 3.2% of the population.

There were 831 households, of which 35.7% had children under the age of 18 living with them, 44.0% were married couples living together, 14.4% had a female householder with no husband present, 5.3% had a male householder with no wife present, and 36.2% were non-families. 30.4% of all households were made up of individuals, and 12.2% had someone living alone who was 65 years of age or older. The average household size was 2.46 and the average family size was 3.04.

The median age in the town was 35.3 years. 24.8% of residents were under the age of 18; 8.8% were between the ages of 18 and 24; 30.1% were from 25 to 44; 22% were from 45 to 64; and 14.2% were 65 years of age or older. The gender makeup of the town was 51.1% male and 48.9% female.

2000 census
As of the 2000 census, there were 2,284 people, 846 households, and 555 families living in the town. The racial makeup of the town was 97.37% White, 0.92% African American, 0.35% Native American, 0.04% Asian, 0.88% from other races, and 0.44% from two or more races. Hispanic or Latino of any race were 1.31% of the population.

There were 846 households, out of which 37.1% had children under the age of 18 living with them, 47.8% were married couples living together, 12.6% had a female householder with no husband present, and 34.3% were non-families. 29.7% of all households were made up of individuals, and 10.2% had someone living alone who was 65 years of age or older. The average household size was 2.51 and the average family size was 3.10.

In the town, the population was spread out, with 29.2% under the age of 18, 10.3% from 18 to 24, 33.2% from 25 to 44, 17.0% from 45 to 64, and 10.2% who were 65 years of age or older. The median age was 30 years. For every 100 females, there were 110.7 males. For every 100 females age 18 and over, there were 108.2 males.

The median income for a household in the town was $36,282, and the median income for a family was $43,438. Males had a median income of $31,473 versus $23,531 for females. The per capita income for the town was $16,405. About 4.6% of families and 4.7% of the population were below the poverty line, including 6.7% of those under age 18 and 5.3% of those age 65 or over.

Education
Children living in Albion go to either Central Noble High School, Central Noble Middle School, or Albion Elementary School.

Albion has a public library, a branch of the Noble County Public Library.

Albion is located near Chain O'Lakes State Park.

Notable people
 Earl Butz (died February 2, 2008), former United States Secretary of Agriculture
 Kyle Macy, All-American Basketball player
 Donald H. Spangler, Naval officer, USS Spangler (DE-696) named for and after him.

References

External links
 Town of Albion, Indiana website
 Noble County Historical Society - local history
 KPC News - local newspaper
 Albion New Era - local newspaper

Towns in Noble County, Indiana
Towns in Indiana
County seats in Indiana